Quitman High School may refer to:

Quitman High School (Arkansas), in Quitman, Arkansas
Quitman County High School, Georgia
Quitman High School (Louisiana), in Quitman, Louisiana
Quitman High School, in Quitman School District, Mississippi
Quitman High School (Texas) in Quitman, Texas

See also
Quitman School District